Alanine dehydrogenase is an enzyme that catalyzes the chemical reaction

L-alanine + H2O + NAD+  pyruvate + NH3 + NADH + H+

The 2 substrates of this enzyme are L-alanine, water, and nicotinamide adenine dinucleotide+ because water is 55M and does not change, whereas its 4 products are pyruvate, ammonia, NADH, and hydrogen ion.

This enzyme participates in taurine and hypotaurine metabolism and reductive carboxylate cycle ( fixation).

Nomenclature 

This enzyme belongs to the family of oxidoreductases, specifically those acting on the CH-NH2 group of donors with NAD+ or NADP+ as acceptor. The systematic name of this enzyme class is L-alanine:NAD+ oxidoreductase (deaminating). Other names in common use include AlaDH, L-alanine dehydrogenase, NAD+-linked alanine dehydrogenase, alpha-alanine dehydrogenase, NAD+-dependent alanine dehydrogenase, alanine oxidoreductase, and NADH-dependent alanine dehydrogenase. T

Structure 

Alanine dehydrogenase contains both a N-terminus and C-terminus domains.

References

Further reading 

 
 
 
 

EC 1.4.1
NADH-dependent enzymes
Enzymes of known structure